Spodnja Dobrava is a settlement east of Moravče in central Slovenia. The area is part of the traditional region of Upper Carniola. It is now included with the rest of the Municipality of Moravče in the Central Slovenia Statistical Region.

Name
Spodnja Dobrava was attested in historical sources as Dobraw in 1386 and 1429.

References

External links

Spodnja Dobrava on Geopedia

Populated places in the Municipality of Moravče